Cyclamen libanoticum (Lebanon cyclamen) is a species of flowering plant in the family Primulaceae. It is native to a small area in the mountains of Lebanon northeast of Beirut at  elevation, in and around Jabal Moussa Biosphere Reserve. From winter to spring, it bears peppery-smelling flowers with 5 oval petals opening white, then turning pale pink, usually with an irregular crimson-magenta mark at the base. Leaves are heart-shaped, gray-green with a darker arrowhead pattern. The tuber only produces roots from one side of the bottom.

Cyclamen ×wellensiekii Iets. is a hybrid obtained in 1969 in the Netherlands between this species and Cyclamen cyprium – another species of subgenus Gyrophoebe. This fertile hybrid has pink flowers from November till March.

Cyclamen ×schwarzii Grey-Wilson is a fertile hybrid Cyclamen pseudibericum × Cyclamen libanoticum. This hybrid can cross back with one of the parents.

References

 Cyclamen: a guide for gardeners, horticulturists, and botanists. Christopher Grey-Wilson. 1997.

External links
 
 Cyclamen Society

libanoticum
Flora of Lebanon
Endemic flora of Lebanon
Flora of Western Asia
Plants described in 1898
National symbols of Lebanon